Richard Herrmann (28 January 1923 – 27 July 1962) was a German football player. He played for the clubs 1. FC Kattowitz (1934–1945) and FSV Frankfurt (1947–1960).

He was part of the West Germany team which won the 1954 FIFA World Cup. He scored a goal in the first round 3–8 defeat by Hungary. However, this was the only match he played in the tournament, and he did not play in the final victory against Hungary. In total he played eight matches for Germany.

After World War II Herrmann was a prisoner of war first in England, then in the United States before being sent back to camp 1008 in Derby, England. Football was being played in that camp and the officials of Derby County were told that there was a talented German POW. However Herrmann intended to get back to Germany as soon as possible. When released in 1947, one of his comrades in camp 1008, the pressman Alfred Ludwig attended to Herrmann and took him along to Frankfurt, where he joined FSV Frankfurt.

Gifted with great ball control and a precise shot, Herrmann soon became a starter for FSV as an outside left. In 1952 AC Torino offered 60,000 D-Mark to Herrmann, but he declined due to being married with a son. Instead he rented a little smoke shop and an outlet for football beds. In 1958 Herrmann ended his career after a bad injury at the age of 35 and began coaching Seckbach 05 for a while. He died from a liver cirrhosis at the age of 39. 

This disease stemmed from an acute hepatitis virus that was transmitted during the 1954 World Cup by means of contaminated syringes containing vitamin C or the methamphetamine Pervitin (also known as Hitler's "miracle pill" or “panzer-chocolate"). The injections were given by the team doctor Franz Loogen, which caused long-term liver damage (“hepatitis C”) to hit a large part of the national team.

References

1923 births
1962 deaths
Sportspeople from Katowice
People from Silesian Voivodeship (1920–1939)
German footballers
Germany international footballers
Polish footballers
Polish people of German descent
1954 FIFA World Cup players
FIFA World Cup-winning players
FSV Frankfurt players
Association football forwards
Deaths from cirrhosis
German military personnel of World War II
German prisoners of war in World War II held by the United Kingdom
German prisoners of war in World War II held by the United States